Jentoft Jensen (1 May 1901 – 24 June 1953) is a Norwegian politician for the Labour Party.

He served as a deputy representative to the Norwegian Parliament from Finnmark during the terms 1945–1949.

References

1901 births
1953 deaths
Deputy members of the Storting
Labour Party (Norway) politicians
Finnmark politicians